Huang Oudong (September 14, 1905 – November 28, 1993) was a People's Republic of China politician. He was born in Yongfeng County, Jiangxi Province. He was Communist Party of China Committee Secretary (1954–1958), Governor (1958–1967) and twice CPPCC Chairman (1955–1959, 1977–1980) of Liaoning. He was also mayor of Shenyang.

1905 births
1993 deaths
People's Republic of China politicians from Jiangxi
Chinese Communist Party politicians from Jiangxi
Governors of Liaoning
Political office-holders in Liaoning
Mayors of Shenyang
Politicians from Ji'an